Antam Sanskar (Gurmukhi: ਅੰਤਮ ਸੰਸਕਾਰ atama sasakāra) refers to the funeral rites in Sikhism. Antam (or Antim) means "final", while sanskar means "rite".

In Sikhism, death is considered a natural process and God's will or Hukam. To a Sikh, birth and death are closely associated, because they are both part of the cycle of human life of "coming and going" ( ਆਵਣੁ ਜਾਣਾ, Aaavan Jaanaa)  which is seen as transient stage towards Liberation ( ਮੋਖੁ ਦੁਆਰੁ, Mokh Du-aar), complete unity with God. Sikhs thus believe in reincarnation. The soul itself is not subject to death. Death is only the progression of the soul on its journey from God, through the created universe and back to God again. In life, a Sikh tries always to constantly remember death so that they may be sufficiently prayerful, detached and righteous to break the cycle of birth and death and return to God.

Sikh practices around death 

Cremation is the preferred method of disposal, although if it is not possible any other methods or if the person willed to be buried then burial or submergence at sea are acceptable. As there is no grave a memorial to the dead or gravestone, etc. is not allowed, because the body is considered to be only the shell, the person's soul was their real essence.

Before death 
At a Sikh's death-bed, relatives and friends should read Sukhmani Sahib, the Prayer of Peace, composed by the fifth Guru Arjan Dev, or simply recite "Waheguru" to console themselves and the dying person. When a death occurs, they should exclaim "Waheguru, Waheguru, Waheguru" (the Wonderful Lord).

If the death occurs in a hospital, the body is taken to the funeral parlor or home before the funeral. In preparation for cremation (usually the day before or day of the cremation), the body is first washed while those present recite the Gurmantar Waheguru or Mool Mantar. Then the body is dressed with clean clothes complete with the Five Ks (in the case of Amritdhari Sikhs).

The day of the cremation 

On the day of the cremation, the body is taken to the Gurdwara or home where Shabads (hymns) from the Guru Granth Sahib, the Sikh Scriptures, are recited by the congregation, which induce feeling of consolation and courage. Kirtan may also be performed by Ragis while the relatives of the deceased recite "Waheguru". This service normally takes from 30 to 60 minutes. At the conclusion of the service, an Ardas is said before the body is taken to the cremation site.

At the point of cremation, a few Shabads are sung and final speeches are made about the deceased person. Then the Kirtan Sohila (night time prayer) is recited and finally Ardas called the "Antim Ardas" ("Final Prayer") is offered. The eldest son or a close relative generally starts the cremation process – by  lighting the fire or pressing the button for the burning to begin. This service usually lasts about 30 to 60 minutes.

The ashes are later collected and immersed in a body of water. Sikhs do not erect monuments over the remains of the dead.

After the cremation ceremony, there may be another service at the Gurdwara, the Sikh place of worship, called the Sahaj Paath Bhog Ceremony.

Sahaj Paath Bhog Ceremony 

After the death of a Sikh, the family of the deceased may undertake a non-continuous reading of the entire Sri Guru Granth Sahib (Sahaj Paath). This reading (Paath) is timed to conclude within ten days of the death of the person. The reading may be undertaken at home or in the Gurdwara and usually takes place on the day of the cremation. The conclusion of this ceremony called the Bhog Ceremony marks the end of the mourning period.

Generally, all the relatives and friends of the family gather together for the Bhog ceremony on the completion of the reading of Guru Granth Sahib. Musicians sing appropriate Shabad hymns, Saloks of the ninth Guru Tegh Bahadur are read, and Ramkali Saad, the Call of God, is recited. After the final prayer, a selected reading or Hukam is taken, and Karah Parshad is distributed to the congregation. Normally food from the Guru's kitchen, Langar, is also served.

References

Ceremonies
Death customs
Sikh practices